Shambhu Dayal Badgujar was an Indian politician belonged to Bharatiya Janata Party. He was two times member of legislative assembly represented Kekri (Ajmer) constituency. He was chairman of Rajasthan Khadi & Village Industries Board. He died in 2017.

References 

2017 deaths
1953
Bharatiya Janata Party politicians from Rajasthan